Ronald Radosh (born 1937) is an American writer, professor, historian, and former Marxist. As he described in his memoirs, Radosh was, like his parents, a member of the Communist Party of the United States of America until the Khrushchev Thaw. He later became an activist in the New Left against the Vietnam War.

He later turned his attention to Julius and Ethel Rosenberg. After studying declassified FBI documents and interviewing their friends and associates, Radosh concluded that the Rosenbergs indeed spied for the Soviet KGB, the crime for which they were executed.

Radosh's political views eventually began to shift towards conservatism, and his work as a historian has been characterized as conservative. Currently employed by the Hudson Institute, Radosh has also published books about the activities of Joseph Stalin's NKVD during the Spanish Civil War and the foundation of the State of Israel.

His most recent book was co-authored with his wife, Allis Radosh: A Safe Haven: Harry S. Truman and the Founding of Israel was published by HarperCollins in 2009. They are currently writing a book about the presidency of Warren G. Harding, to be published by Simon & Schuster.

Early life

Radosh was born in New York City. His parents, Reuben Radosh and Ida Kretschman, were Jewish immigrants from Eastern Europe. He stated that his earliest memory is of being taken to a May Day parade in Union Square.

In the 1940s and the 1950s, he attended the Little Red School House and Elisabeth Irwin High School, both of which were private schools. He attended the communist-run Camp Woodland for Children in the Catskill Mountains. His memoirs vividly describe school-day encounters with Mary Travers, Woody Guthrie, and Peter Seeger. On June 19, 1953, he demonstrated in Union Square with other members of the Labor Youth League against the execution of Julius and Ethel Rosenberg. He began attending the University of Wisconsin–Madison in the fall of 1955. He has said that his desire at the time was both to study history, which Karl Marx considered queen of the sciences, and to become a leader of America's communists. Despite being raised to always defend the actions of the Soviet Union, Radosh developed a close friendship with Professor George Mosse, a Jewish refugee from Nazi Germany and anti-Stalinist.

In 1959, he arrived at the University of Iowa and intended to work towards his master's degree. Despite being raised as a red diaper baby by fellow travelers, Radosh was shocked by revelations of Stalin's crimes that began to be released during the Khrushchev Thaw. Although he had been a leader of Madison's Labor Youth League, he eventually broke with the Soviet-backed Communist Party USA and became a founding father of the American New Left. Radosh's fondness for the writings of Isaac Deutscher enraged the Madison Communist Party cell. Its attempts to bring him back into the party line was a major part of Radosh's break with communism. In 1963, he returned to New York City with his wife and children.

Vietnam War
After teaching at two community colleges in Brooklyn, Radosh joined the New York chapter of the Committee to Stop the War in Vietnam. He recalled:
When Norman Thomas died in 1968, I wrote what may have been the only published negative assessment of his life. Most obituaries heralded Thomas as the nation's conscience, a man of principle who had turned out to be right about a great deal. Of course, Thomas was against the war in Vietnam; he had made a famous speech in which he said he came not to burn the American flag but to cleanse it. But for radicals like myself, that proved that he was a sellout. His opposition to the war was so tame, I argued, that he actually helped the American ruling class. I claimed that Thomas' opposition to LBJ's bombing campaign was only a "tactical" difference with the President. Thomas' chief sin, in my view, was to have written that he did not, "regard Vietcong terrorism as virtuous". He was guilty of attacking the heroic Vietnamese people, instead of the United States, which was the enemy of the world's people. My final judgment was that Thomas had "accepted the Cold War, its ideology and ethics and had decided to enlist in fighting its battles" on the wrong—the anti-communist—side.

Soon afterward, Radosh also joined the New York chapter of Students for a Democratic Society.

In his book Prophets on the Right, completed in 1974, Radosh referred to himself as both "an advocate of a socialist solution to America's domestic crisis" and "a radical historian." The book profiles several historical conservative or far-right isolationists, "critics of American globalism," men who were "outside the consensus, or the mainstream... [and] regarded as subversive of the existing order." Radosh's stated aim in writing the book was to "move us... to think carefully about alternative possibilities" to "our current predicament," which was a clear reference to the ongoing Vietnam War.

In 1976, Radosh was a "founding sponsor" of James Weinstein's magazine In These Times.

Career
Radosh's writings have appeared in The New Republic, The Weekly Standard, National Review, the blog FrontPage Magazine, and many other newspapers and magazines.

In the 1983 book The Rosenberg File, he and co-author Joyce Milton concluded that Julius Rosenberg was guilty of espionage and that Ethel was aware of his activities. A second edition, published by Yale University Press, in 1997 incorporated newly obtained evidence from the former Soviet Union. Radosh and Milton also condemned prosecutorial misconduct in the case.

As a result of their 1983 book and revelations in the Vassiliev papers as well as the Venona decrypts, a consensus has emerged that rather than having been framed by the US government, both Rosenbergs had been Soviet agents, and Julius Rosenberg had been an agent who put together an active network that stole significant military secrets for the Soviet Union.

The co-defendant Morton Sobell's 2008 interview with Sam Roberts of The New York Times had him admit his own guilt and that of Julius Rosenberg after years of proclaiming his innocence, which supported the thesis of The Rosenberg File. A year later, Radosh and Steven Usdin held an interview with Sobell. Writing in The Weekly Standard, Sobell outlined the dimensions of the material that he had passed to the Soviets as part of the Rosenberg network.

Radosh's memoirs, published in 2001 as Commies: A Journey Through the Old Left, the New Left, and the Leftover Left, discussed the various reasons for his disillusionment with the Left and utopian Marxist solutions, including his mid-1970s trip to Cuba, his experiences in Central America in the 1980s, and how he was read out of the Left because he had dared to tell the truth about the Rosenbergs' espionage.

Radosh is now an adjunct fellow at the Hudson Institute in Washington, DC, and a professor of history emeritus at the City University of New York (CUNY). He was a faculty member at Queensborough Community College and the Graduate Faculty in History at CUNY.

Family
Radosh married Alice Schweig in the summer of 1959. He recalls, "Our wedding was on Labor Day weekend, and after the ceremony we drove into New York to spend one night in town. We celebrated our wedding by watching the annual proletarian Labor Day parade that still marched through downtown New York." They separated in 1969 and later divorced.

In October 1975, Radosh married Allis Rosenberg, who has a PhD in American History and has co-authored two books with him. The couple reside in Silver Spring, Maryland.

Controversy
On 7 August 2014, Radosh reviewed Diana West's American Betrayal in FrontPage Magazine. He criticized her limited knowledge of the scholarly literature and called her thesis a "yellow journalism conspiracy theory." West wrote that infiltration of the US government by Stalinist agents and fellow travelers had significantly altered Allied policies during World War II to favor the Soviet Union.

West published a follow-up book focusing on the attack on her by Radosh and others. The journal The New Criterion had a full-fledged dialogue about the issues that arose because of his critique of West.

Works

Books
 American Labor and United States Foreign Policy. New York: Random House, 1969.
 Debs. Englewood Cliffs, NJ: Prentice-Hall, 1971.
 A New History of Leviathan: Essays on the American Corporate State. Edited with Murray Rothbard. New York: E. P. Dutton, 1972.
 Prophets On The Right: Profiles of Conservative Critics of American Globalism. New York: Simon & Schuster, 1975.
 The New Cuba: Paradoxes and Potentials. New York: Morrow, 1976.
 The Rosenberg File: A Search for Truth. Co-authored with Joyce Milton. New York: Holt, Rinehart and Winston, 1983; Reissued with new introduction: New Haven: Yale University Press, 1993.
 Divided They Fell: The Demise of the Democratic Party, 1964–1996. New York: Free Press, 1996.
 The Amerasia Spy Case: Prelude to McCarthyism. Co-authored with Harvey Klehr. University of North Carolina Press, 1996.
 Commies: A Journey Through the Old Left, the New Left, and the Leftover Left. San Francisco: Encounter Books, 2001.
 Spain Betrayed: The Soviet Union in the Spanish Civil War Co-authored with Mary R. Habeck and Grigorii Nikolaevich Sevostianov. New Haven: Yale University Press, 2001.
 Red Star Over Hollywood: The Film Colony's Long Romance With The Left. Co-authored with Allis Radosh. San Francisco: Encounter Books, 2005.
 A Safe Haven: Harry S. Truman and the Founding of Israel. Co-authored with Allis Radosh. New York: HarperCollins, 2009.

Articles
"John Spargo and Wilson's Russian Policy, 1920." Journal of American History, vol. 52, no. 3 (Dec. 1965), pp. 548–565. .
 "Were the Rosenbergs Framed?" New York Review of Books (Jul. 21, 1983).
 "Books in Review. The Black Book of Communism: Crimes, Terror, Repression." First Things (Feb. 2000).
 "The Sandbagging of Robert 'KC' Johnson." New York Sun.
 "Why Conservatives Are So Upset with Thomas Woods's Politically Incorrect History Book." History News Network.
 "The Cuba Conundrum: Who Is Attacking Our Diplomats and Spies in Cuba?" Hudson Institute (Oct. 4, 2017).

Book reviews
 "Democracy and the Formation of Foreign Policy: The Case of F.D.R. and America's Entrance Into World War II." Review of F.D.R.'s Undeclared War, 1939 to 1941 by T. R. Fehrenbach. Left & Right, vol. 3, no. 3 (Spring/Autumn 1967) pp. 31–38.

Contributions
 "Preface." As We Go Marching, by John T. Flynn. New York: Free Life Editions, 1973.

References

External links
 
 Articles at The Daily Beast
 Articles at National Review
 Articles at The New York Review of Books
 Ronald Radosh at the Hudson Institute

1937 births
Living people
20th-century American male writers
20th-century American non-fiction writers
21st-century American male writers
21st-century American non-fiction writers
City University of New York faculty
American anti–Vietnam War activists
American communists of the Stalin era
American historians of espionage
American people of Russian-Jewish descent
American political writers
Former Marxists
Historians of communism
Historians of the United States
Hudson Institute
Jewish American historians
New Left
Writers from Martinsburg, West Virginia
University of Wisconsin–Madison alumni
Writers from New York City
Date of birth missing (living people)
American male non-fiction writers
Little Red School House alumni
Historians from New York (state)